Magvető is a Hungarian book publishing company based in Budapest. It primarily publishes domestic and international works of literary fiction.

History

Magvető was established in 1955 as a publisher of the Magyar Írók Szövetsége (now the Hungarian Writers' Association). Its main task was to publish contemporary Hungarian fiction and classical Hungarian literature. However, it also published world literature works since it was founded. Upon its founding, a special competitive situation was created within the framework of the state socialist system between Magvető and the similar publisher Szépirodalmi Könyvkiadó. It soon became apparent that works which differed from the mainstream of literary policy, which provoked political or aesthetic debates, were more likely to be published by Magvető. Such works included Endre Fejes's Rozsdatemető, Géza Ottlik's Hajnali háztetők and Ferenc Sánta's Húsz óra. Magvető published works by Iván Mándy, Miklós Mészöly, László Nagy, Ágnes Nemes Nagy, Géza Ottlik, Ottó Orbán, István Örkény, Magda Szabó és Sándor Weöres is.

After 1956, the publisher was "confiscated" from the association. Previously, the publisher's own shop, the Magvető bookstore on Szent István Boulevard, also distributed the publisher's works. However, after the 1956 change of regime in Socialist Hungary, it merged into the network of the Libri book distribution company.

Management
The founder of Magvető was the secretary of the Writers' Association, Géza Képes, a poet and translator. Képes served as co-director of Magvető with Géza Hegedüs. János Pilinszky also worked as a proofreader on the publisher's first volumes. The founding director had to leave Magvető in 1957 due to his activities during the Hungarian Revolution of 1956, and was replaced by Ferenc Vadász. In 1961, György Kardos became the head of the Magvető. Kardos previously served as a Lieutenant Colonel working in military intelligence for the State Protection Authority (ÁVH). Kardos is the longest-serving director Magvető, having served for approximately 25 years. During his tenure as its director, Magvető became one of the most successful Hungarian publishing companies of the time. It published the works of many important writers including Berkesi András, István Csurka, György Moldova and Magda Szabó. However, it also launched the careers of many young writers who did not have the opportunity to publish elsewhere. Kardos was followed by critic Miklós Jovánovics and editor Mária Hegedős, respectively, as director of Magvető.

In 1993, it transformed into a publishing company (kft.-vé). It was then purchased by Líra és Lant Kereskedelmi Rt. (now Líra Könyv Zrt.) and has been operating independently within the Líra publishing group ever since. From 1995 to 2015, Géza Morcsányi was the head of the publisher. Under Morcsányi's leadership, Magvető became one of the most prestigious Hungarian fiction publishers, where the works of the most prestigious Hungarian authors of the turn of the millennium were published, including Imre Kertész, the only Hungarian recipient of the Nobel Prize in Literature. Magvető was presented the MKKE's "Publisher of the Year" award in 2003, 2006, 2010, 2011 and 2013.

From March 2015 to June 2016, Magvető was led by Krisztián Nyáry, who then continued his work as the creative director of Líra Könyv Zrt. The longest-serving employee of the publisher was Györgyi Bezúr, a technical manager who worked continuously at Magvető from 1961 to the end of 2016.

Series and sales
Magvető published  (1974–1994) and the series of books in the Rakéta Regénytár (popularly abbreviated as Ra-Re; from 1978). Successful book series include Világkönyvtár, Magvető Kiskönyvtár and Új Termés, which introduces the first-volume poets. Successful book series include Világkönyvtár, Magvető Kiskönyvtár and Új Termés, which introduces the first-volume poets. Magvető also publishes the Gyorsuló idő educational series as well as the  memoirs series. In 1963, Magvető launched , which has been a defining annual anthology of contemporary poetry ever since. An anthology of the most important Hungarian novellas, entitled Körkép, has been published by Magvető since 1964.

Within a decade after its founding, Magvető became one of the most influential Hungarian cultural institutions. In 1966, Magvető published more than two million copies. It continuously increased its output over time and, in 1981, Magvető published 5.4 million books. Today, it published a total of 6.4 million of the entire Hungarian literary book production.

Authors
Among the poets, Ferenc Juhász's collection of poetry entitled A virágok hatalma was published by Magvető in 1955. Cartoonist Tibor Kaján's book entitled Kaján rajzok was also published by Magvető in 1955. It also published Endre Fejes's volume of short stories entitled A hazudós in 1958.

In addition to publishing the works of Hungarian writers already recognized by critics and the public audience, Magvető also focuses on publishing the debut works of young talented writers who are early in their careers, and promotes the continued output of these writers. Among others, Magvető publishes the works of Tibor Babiczky, Péter Bognár, Renátó Fehér, Ákos Győrffy, Lili Kemény, Noémi Kiss, Tibor Noé Kiss, András Maros, Koppány Zsolt Nagy, László Potozky, Csaba Székely, Petra Szőcs, Kinga Tóth, Benedek Totth.

The  honours the best Hungarian contemporary fiction from the previous year. In 2015, 77 works of fiction were nominated for the 10th anniversary of the AEGON Art Award. Based on the decision of the jury, the works of ten authors advanced to the second round, eight of which were published by Magvető. As of 2020, the award has been won by 11 books published by Magvető since the award's inception in 2006:

 2006 – Fogság by György Spiró
 2007 – Visszaút az időben by Zsuzsa Rakovszky
 2008 – Asztalizene by János Térey
 2009 – Önkéntes vak. Versek, 2006–2007 by Tamás Jónás
 2011 – Esti by Péter Esterházy
 2012 – Mellettem elférsz by Krisztián Grecsó
 2014 – Boldog észak. Aimé Billion mesél by Árpád Kun
 2016 – Távozó fa. Versek, 2005–2014 by Imre Oravecz
 2017 – Baron Wenckheim's Homecoming by László Krasznahorkai
 2019 – A Vak Remény by Zsuzsa Takács
 2020 – Jól láthatóan lógok itt by Ádám Nádasdy

Magvető publishes the most Hungarian authors from abroad: after Budapest, most Magvető writers were born or raised in Cluj-Napoca, Romania. Péter Esterházy was Magvető's oldest published author, having published all of his works since the beginning of his career in the 1970s. As of 2015, the oldest active author of Magvető is Imre Kertész, 85, and the youngest is Lili Kemény, 22.

Magvető continuously publishes several 20th-century Hungarian classical literature or other major works, including the works of Géza Csáth, Péter Hajnóczy, G. Gyorgy Kardos, Gyula Krúdy, Alexander Lenard, Ottó Orbán, Géza Ottlik, György Petri, Szilárd Rubin, Miklós Szentkuthy, Antal Szerb and Sándor Tar.

When publishing translations of contemporary works of world literature, Magvető selects works of the same quality that its readers are accustomed to and expect from in the field of classical and contemporary Hungarian literature. Some major foreign works Magvető has published includes works by Andrzej Stasiuk, Anna Gavalda, César Aira, Charles Frazier, Colum McCann, Cormac McCarthy, Daniel Kehlmann, Elena Ferrante, Frank McCourt, Gabriel García Márquez, Juan Marsé, Hitomi Kanehara, Lyudmila Ulitskaya, Mariam Petrosyan, Michel Houellebecq, Terézia Mora and Thomas Pynchon.

Magvető Café
On 11 April 2017, Magvető opened a café named Magvető Café on Dohány Street in Budapest. It serves as a meeting place for authors and readers. Books published by Magvető are sold inside. The café serves coffee, wines and breakfast.

Directors

Géza Képes and Géza Hegedüs (1955–1957)
Ferenc Vadász (1957–1961)
György Kardos (6 October 1961 – 1986)
Miklós Jovánovics (1986–1990)
Mária Hegedős (1990–1993)
Géza Morcsányi (1995–2015)
Krisztián Nyáry (2015–2016)
Anna Dávid (2016–)

Book series
 Gyorsuló idő  (English, "Accelerating Time") – general knowledge series (since 1975)
 Harminc év (English, "Thirty Years") – the most significant works of post-World War II Hungarian literature (up to 1980, jointly with Szépirodalmi Könyvkiadó)
 Időmérték (English, "Timeline")
 Körkép  (English, "Panorama") – anthology of novellas
 Magvető Kiskönyvtár (English, "Magvető Small Library") 
 Magvető novellárium (English, "Magvető Short Story")  
 Magvető Remekírók (English, "Magvető Great Writers")
 Magvető Zsebkönyvtár (English, "Magvető Pocket Library")
 Milleniumi Könyvtár (English, "Millennium Library")
 Nemzet és emlékezet (English, "Nation and Memory")   
  (English, "From Idea to Movie")   
  és Rakéta Regénytár (English, "Rocket Novel Newspaper" and "Rocket Novel")
 Rivalda – anthology of plays
 Szép versek (English, "Beautiful Poems") – anthology of poetry
 Tények és tanúk (English, "Facts and Witnesses") – autobiographies, memoirs   
 Új Termés (English, "New Crop") – first-volume poets    
 Világkönyvtár (English, "World Library") – contemporary works of world literature

Notable publications
 Tibor Déry: Niki: The Story of a Dog (1956)
 Géza Ottlik: School at the Frontier (1959)
 Endre Fejes: Rozsdatemető (1962)
 Ferenc Sánta: Húsz óra
 Imre Kertész: Fatelessness (1975)
 Péter Esterházy: Termelési-regény (kisssregény) (1979)
 László Krasznahorkai: Satantango (1985)
 László Krasznahorkai: The Melancholy of Resistance (1989)
 Péter Esterházy: Harmonia cælestis (2000)
 Attila Bartis: Tranquility (2001)
 László Krasznahorkai: Baron Wenckheim's Homecoming (2016)
 Zsuzsa Takács: A Vak Remény (2018)

Notable authors

 Zsófia Bán
 Attila Bartis
 László Bertók
 Ádám Bodor
 Ildikó Boldizsár
 Centauri
 László Csabai
 András Cserna-Szabó
 László Darvasi
 György Dragomán
 Virág Erdős
 Péter Esterházy
 László Garaczi
 Krisztián Grecsó
 Péter György
 Viktor Horváth
 Péter Kántor
 István Kemény
 Imre Kertész
 András Ferenc Kovács

 László Krasznahorkai
 Dénes Krusovszky
 Árpád Kun
 Júlia Lángh
 Aliz Mosonyi
 Ádám Nádasdy
 Ottó Orbán
 Lajos Parti Nagy
 György Petri
 Zsuzsa Rakovszky
 György Spiró
 Anna T. Szabó
 Balázs Szálinger
 Ferenc Szijj
 László Szilasi
 István Szilágyi
 Zsuzsa Takács
 Krisztina Tóth
 Dániel Varró
 Pál Závada

See also
 Hungarian literature

Notes

References

External links
Magvető official website
Magunkról

Book publishing companies of Hungary
Publishing companies established in 1955
1955 establishments in Hungary
Mass media in Budapest
Coffeehouses and cafés in Hungary